Campylosteira is a genus of lace bugs in the tribe Tingini.  Species are recorded from Asia, Africa, North America and Europe and includes C. verna found in the British Isles.

Species
The Lace Bugs Database lists the following:
 Campylosteira bosnica Horváth, 1892
 Campylosteira ciliata Fieber, 1844
 Campylosteira dispar Horváth, 1905
 Campylosteira eximia Horváth, 1892
 Campylosteira falleni Fieber, 1844
 Campylosteira heissi Péricart, 1981
 Campylosteira horvathi Drake, 1951
 Campylosteira jakesi Stusak, 1979
 Campylosteira libanotica Horváth, 1906
 Campylosteira moroccana Puton, 1887
 Campylosteira orientalis Horváth, 1881
 Campylosteira parvula Ferrari, 1874
 Campylosteira perithrix Puton, 1887
 Campylosteira pilicornis Horváth, 1906
 Campylosteira pilifera Reuter, 1880
 Campylosteira rotundata Takeya, 1933
 Campylosteira serena Horváth, 1902
 Campylosteira sinuata Fieber, 1861
 Campylosteira sororcula Horváth, 1905
 Campylosteira verna (Fallén, 1826) - type species (as Tingis verna Fallén)

References

External Links
British Bugs: Campylosteira verna (retrieved 6 November 2021)
 BioLib.cz: genus Campylosteira Fieber, 1844
 Ukrainian Biodiversity Information Network Genus: Campylosteira Fieber, 1844 

Tingidae
Heteroptera genera
Hemiptera of Asia
Hemiptera of Europe